The 1941 All-Southern Conference football team consists of American football players chosen by the Associated Press (AP) and United Press (UP) for the All-Southern Conference football team for the 1941 college football season.

The 1941 Duke Blue Devils football team won the Southern Conference championship, was ranked No. 2 in the final AP Poll, and placed four players on the first team: back Steve Lach (AP-1, UP-1), end Bob Gantt (AP-1, UP-2); tackle Mike Karmazin (AP-1, UP-1); and center Bob Barnett (AP-1, UP-1).

All-Southern Conference selections

Backs
 Steve Lach, Duke (AP-1, UP-1) (College Football Hall of Fame)
 Harvey Johnson, William & Mary (AP-1, UP-1)
 Charlie Timmons, Clemson (AP-1, UP-1)
 Stan Stasica, South Carolina (AP-1, UP-1)
 Bosh Pritchard, VMI (AP-2, UP-2)
 Joe Muha, VMI (AP-2, UP-2)
 Tommy Prothro, Duke (AP-3, UP-2)
 Payne, Clemson (AP-2)
 Siegfried, Duke (AP-2)
 John Polanski, Wake Forest (UP-2)
 Spencer, Davidson (AP-3)
 Harry Dunkle, North Carolina (AP-3)
 Proctor, Furman (AP-3)

Ends
 Joe Blalock, Clemson (AP-1, UP-1)
 Bob Gantt, Duke (AP-1, UP-2)
 Glen Knox, William & Mary (UP-1)
 Al Piasecky, Duke (AP-2, UP-2)
 Knox, William & Mary (AP-2)
 Cline, Wake Forest (AP-3)
 Nowak, South Carolina (AP-3)

Tackles
 Mike Karmazin, Duke (AP-1, UP-1)
 George Fritts, Clemson (AP-1, UP-1) (College Football Hall of Fame)
 Bass, William & Mary (AP-2, UP-2)
 Dick Steck, North Carolina (AP-2, UP-2)
 Burlin, Maryland (AP-3)
 Preston, Wake Forest (AP-3)

Guards
 Garrard Ramesey, William & Mary (AP-1, UP-1)
 Carl Givler, Wake Forest (AP-1, UP-1)
 Roger McClure, Virginia Tech (AP-2, UP-2)
 Frank Kapriva, Wake Forest (AP-3, UP-2)
 Wade Padgett, Clemson (AP-2)
 Goddard, Duke (AP-3)

Centers
 Bob Barnett, Duke (AP-1, UP-1)
 Sossomon, South Carolina (AP-2, UP-2)
 Carl Suntheimer, North Carolina (AP-3)

Key
AP = Associated Press, selected by the region's sports writers and coaches

UP = United Press, based on a poll of coaches and sports writers in the Southern Conference area

See also
1941 College Football All-America Team

References

All-Southern Conference football team
All-Southern Conference football teams